In group theory, the wreath product is a special combination of two groups based on the semidirect product. It is formed by the action of one group on many copies of another group, somewhat analogous to exponentiation. Wreath products are used in the classification of permutation groups and also provide a way of constructing interesting examples of groups.

The notion generalizes to semigroups and is a central construction in the Krohn–Rhodes structure theory of finite semigroups.

Definition 

Let  be a group and let  be a group acting on a set  (on the left).

 

for all  and all .

The restricted wreath product  is constructed in the same way as the unrestricted wreath product except that one uses the direct sum as the base of the wreath product.

In the most common case, and  acts on itself by left multiplication. This is called the regular wreath product.

Notation and conventions 

The structure of the wreath product of A by H depends on the H-set Ω and in case Ω is infinite it also depends on whether one uses the restricted or unrestricted wreath product. However, in literature the notation used may be deficient and one needs to pay attention to the circumstances.

 In literature A≀ΩH may stand for the unrestricted wreath product A WrΩ H or the restricted wreath product A wrΩ H.
 Similarly, A≀H may stand for the unrestricted regular wreath product A Wr H or the restricted regular wreath product A wr H.
 In literature the H-set Ω may be omitted from the notation even if Ω ≠ H.
 In the special case that H = Sn is the symmetric group of degree n it is common in the literature to assume that Ω = {1,...,n} (with the natural action of Sn) and then omit Ω from the notation. That is, A≀Sn commonly denotes A≀{1,...,n}Sn instead of the regular wreath product A≀SnSn. In the first case the base group is the product of n copies of A, in the latter it is the product of n! copies of A.

Properties

Agreement of unrestricted and restricted wreath product on finite Ω 
Since the finite direct product is the same as the finite direct sum of groups, it follows that the unrestricted A WrΩ H and the restricted wreath product A wrΩ H agree if the H-set Ω is finite. In particular this is true when Ω = H is finite.

Subgroup 
A wrΩ H is always a subgroup of A WrΩ H.

Cardinality 
If A, H and Ω are finite, then
 |A≀ΩH| = |A||Ω||H|.

Universal embedding theorem 

Universal embedding theorem: If G is an extension of A by H, then there exists a subgroup of the unrestricted wreath product A≀H which is isomorphic to G. This is also known as the Krasner–Kaloujnine embedding theorem. The Krohn–Rhodes theorem involves what is basically the semigroup equivalent of this.

Canonical actions of wreath products 

If the group A acts on a set Λ then there are two canonical ways to construct sets from Ω and Λ on which A WrΩ H (and therefore also A wrΩ H) can act.

 The imprimitive wreath product action on Λ × Ω.
 
 The primitive wreath product action on ΛΩ.
 An element in ΛΩ is a sequence (λω) indexed by the H-set Ω. Given an element  its operation on (λω) ∈ ΛΩ is given by

Examples 

 The Lamplighter group is the restricted wreath product ℤ2≀ℤ.
  (Generalized symmetric group).

 The base of this wreath product is the n-fold direct product

 ℤmn = ℤm × ... × ℤm

 of copies of ℤm where the action φ : Sn → Aut(ℤmn) of the symmetric group Sn of degree n is given by

 φ(σ)(α1,..., αn) := (ασ(1),..., ασ(n)).

 S2≀Sn (Hyperoctahedral group).

 The action of Sn on {1,...,n} is as above. Since the symmetric group S2 of degree 2 is isomorphic to ℤ2 the hyperoctahedral group is a special case of a generalized symmetric group.

 The smallest non-trivial wreath product is ℤ2≀ℤ2, which is the two-dimensional case of the above hyperoctahedral group. It is the symmetry group of the square, also called Dih4, the dihedral group of order 8.
 Let p be a prime and let n≥1. Let P be a Sylow p-subgroup of the symmetric group Spn. Then P is isomorphic to the iterated regular wreath product Wn = ℤp ≀ ℤp≀...≀ℤp of n copies of ℤp. Here W1 := ℤp and Wk := Wk−1≀ℤp for all k ≥ 2. For instance, the Sylow 2-subgroup of S4 is the above ℤ2≀ℤ2 group.

 The Rubik's Cube group is a subgroup of index 12 in the product of wreath products, (ℤ3≀S8) × (ℤ2≀S12), the factors corresponding to the symmetries of the 8 corners and 12 edges.

 The Sudoku validity preserving transformations (VPT) group contains the double wreath product (S3 ≀ S3) ≀ S2, where the factors are the permutation of rows/columns within a 3-row or 3-column band or stack (S3), the permutation of the bands/stacks themselves (S3) and the transposition, which interchanges the bands and stacks (S2). Here, the index sets Ω are the set of bands (resp. stacks) (|Ω| = 3) and the set {bands, stacks} (|Ω| = 2). Accordingly, |S3 ≀ S3| = |S3|3|S3| = (3!)4 and |(S3 ≀ S3) ≀ S2| = |S3 ≀ S3|2|S2| = (3!)8 × 2.
Wreath products arise naturally in the symmetry group of complete rooted trees and their graphs. For example, the repeated (iterated) wreath product S2 ≀ S2 ≀ ... ≀ S2 is the automorphism group of a complete binary tree.

References

External links 
 Wreath product in Encyclopedia of Mathematics. 
 Some Applications of the Wreath Product Construction. 

Group products
Permutation groups
Binary operations